Synnoma is a genus of moths belonging to the subfamily Tortricinae of the family Tortricidae. It contains only one species, the rabbitbrush webbing moth (Synnoma lynosyrana), which is found in North America, including Arizona.

The wingspan is 14–21 mm. Adults have gray-brown wings speckled with dark spots and often some whitish patches. Females do not fly. There is one generation per year.

The larvae feed on Chrysothamnus, Ericameria and Gutierrezia species. The larvae create dense tents of silk mixed with food fragments, frass and cast skins. They are grayish green.

See also
List of Tortricidae genera

References

Gallery

External links
tortricidae.com

Sparganothini
Monotypic moth genera
Moths of North America
Taxa named by Thomas de Grey, 6th Baron Walsingham
Tortricidae genera